Limnanthes alba is a species of flowering plant in the meadowfoam family known by the common name white meadowfoam. It is native to California and Oregon, where it grows in wet grassy habitat, such as vernal pools and moist spots in woodlands. It generally grows in poorly drained soils. It is an annual herb producing an erect or decumbent stem up to about 30 centimeters long. The leaves divided into several lobed or unlobed leaflets. The flower is cup-shaped with white petals 1 to 1.5 centimeters long.

This grassland wildflower is also under small-scale cultivation. It is the source of meadowfoam seed oil and The fruit of the plant, a nutlet, is 20 to 30% oil. The oil is one of the most stable vegetable oils known and can be converted to waxes and lubricants, similar to whale oil. White meadowfoam is very susceptible to the Botrytis cinerea fungus; commercial crops were devastated during the 1982 and 1984 growing seasons.

References

External links
Jepson Manual Treatment
Photo gallery

Limnanthaceae
Edible nuts and seeds
Flora of California
Flora of Oregon
Flora of North America
Flora without expected TNC conservation status